The Brunei Open in badminton was an international tournament held in Brunei from 1992 to 1996 and in 1998.

Past winners

References